Louis John Rhead (November 6, 1857 – July 29, 1926) was an English-born American artist, illustrator, author and angler who was born in Etruria, Staffordshire, England. He emigrated to the United States at the age of twenty-four.

Early life
The Rhead family had operated and worked in the Staffordshire Potteries for at least three generations. Louis' father George W. Rhead worked in the pottery industry and was a highly respected gilder and ceramic artist. In the 1870s, George Rhead taught art and design in Staffordshire schools. He founded Fenton School of Art.

Louis and all his siblings attended their father's art classes and worked in the potteries as children. His brothers Frederick Alfred Rhead and George Woolliscroft Rhead Jr. (1855–1920) were also artistic, and Louis, later in his career, sometimes collaborated with them, for example in book-illustration projects.  Louis was also the uncle of the potters Charlotte Rhead and Frederick Hurten Rhead.

Because Louis demonstrated exceptional talent, when he was thirteen in 1872, his father sent him to study in Paris, France with artist Gustave Boulanger. After three years in Paris, Louis Rhead returned to work in the potteries as a ceramic artist at Minton and later at Wedgwood. In 1879 he gained a scholarship at the National Art Training School, South Kensington, London.  After graduating from South Kensington in 1881, Louis Rhead worked briefly for Wedgwood and worked for the London publisher Cassell.

U.S. career
In 1883 at the age of twenty-four, Louis Rhead was offered a position as Art Director for the U.S. publishing firm of D. Appleton in New York City.  He accepted and emigrated to the U.S. in the fall of 1883.  In 1884 he married Catherine Bogart Yates, thus becoming an American citizen.  Louis and  Catherine lived in Flatbush, Brooklyn overlooking Prospect Park for forty years.

In the early 1890s, Rhead became a prominent poster artist and was heavily influenced by the work of Swiss artist Eugène Grasset.  During the poster craze of the early 1890s, Rhead's poster art appeared regularly in Harper's Bazaar, Harper's Magazine, St. Nicolas, Century Magazine, Ladies Home Journal and Scribner's Magazine. An exhibition of his work was organized by the Salon des Cent in Paris. Three of his posters wer published in Les Maîtres de l'Affiche. In 1895 he won a Gold Medal for Best American Poster Design at the first International Poster Show in Boston.

By the late 1890s, the popularity of poster art declined, and Rhead turned his skills to book illustration.  Between 1902 and his death in 1926, Rhead illustrated numerous children's books published by Harpers and others.  Most notable among these were editions of: Robin Hood, The Swiss Family Robinson, Robinson Crusoe, The Deerslayer, Treasure Island, Kidnapped and Heidi.

Angling
Rhead was an avid fly fisher and by his own account started fishing for trout in the U.S. sometime between 1888 and 1890.  In 1901 he became interested in angling art and much of his later published works deal with fishing and fly fishing.  Rhead was also a tackle dealer and sold his own line of artificial flies. His most famous and celebrated work is American Trout-Stream Insects (1916).  At the time of its publication this was one of the first and most comprehensive studies of stream entomology ever published in America.

Paul Schullery in American Fly Fishing—A History (1987) says this about Rhead:

Louis Rhead was one of the most creative, fresh-thinking, and stimulating of American fly-fishing writers, a man of extraordinary gifts.  ... his major effort was American Trout Stream Insects, a book based on several years of trout fishing in the Catskills.

Death
Louis Rhead's death was somewhat unusual.  He died from a heart attack at his retirement home in Amityville, Long Island.  A portion of his obituary in The New York Times, Friday July 30, 1926:

Exhibition
Bernard Bumpus (1921–2004) was the leading authority on the Rhead family.  In the 1980s Bumpus curated an exhibition Rhead Artists and Potters at the Geffrye Museum in London, which mainly featured works of art by the Rhead family, but also included examples of Louis Rhead's flies.  It toured several UK Museums including the Potteries Museum & Art Gallery in Staffordshire.  Bumpus hoped to take a version of the exhibition to the US, but, despite American interest in the Rhead family, this project foundered.

Bibliography

 
 
 
 
 
 
 
 
 
 
 
 
 
 
 
 
 
 
 

In the early 20th century, Rhead was a prolific contributor of angling articles in the sporting press--The American Angler, Outing Magazine, Field & Stream, and Forest and Stream

References

External links

UNCG American Publishers' Trade Bindings: Louis Rhead

Angling writers
American children's book illustrators
People from Etruria, Staffordshire
American poster artists
American fishers
1857 births
1926 deaths
Fly fishing